Rise of Nightmares, known in Japan as , is a survival horror video game developed and published by Sega for the Xbox 360. The game was revealed at the 2010 Tokyo Game Show, and is designed specifically for Kinect. It was the first M-rated game to be released for the Kinect.

Characters
 Josh
 The main protagonist of the game, on vacation in Romania with his wife, Kate. He has a drinking problem, and it is threatening his marriage. He survives the train wreck, and begins searching for his wife, who was kidnapped by Ernst at the behest of Viktor, a deranged mad scientist. He is the character the player controls for most of the game, in one form or another.

 Kate
 Josh's wife, who was on vacation with him in Romania in an attempt to patch up their failing marriage. She becomes angry upon catching him with a hip flask after he promised to stop drinking, and storms away, leading to the events of the game. She is kidnapped shortly after, before the train derails. Most of the game is spent searching for her. She has something she needs to talk to him about.

 Viktor
 A mad scientist with an interest in states of life and death, and the main antagonist of the game. He has Kate kidnapped, and is responsible for the deaths and transformations of almost everyone in the mansion, in pursuit of an ultimate goal. He has great plans in mind, for Josh and his wife both, for very personal reasons.

 Yeli
 A Romanian fortune teller, who predicts Josh's fate on the train. She inexplicably survives the train wreck, and immediately heads for the mansion, unknowingly leading the frightened survivors right to the hell she had once escaped. She was a prisoner there in the past, but was aided in her escape by an unnamed detective. Yeli is the wife of Ernst.

Ernst
 The masked juggernaut, and Viktor's most trusted servant. He was dispatched to kidnap Kate and derail the train. He was once a prisoner in the mansion as well, but unlike his wife, he failed to escape. Instead, he became one of the most powerful of Viktor's warped experiments, and one of the most frightful. The helmet he wears severely obstructs his vision, but Ernst makes up for lack of sight with an inhumanly keen ear, which allows him to detect people in the area from just their movements. When he appears, Josh is forced to either flee or freeze, to avoid a rather gruesome death at his hands. Eventually, the player has to fight him—but he isn't quite what he seems, something Josh will come to understand.

 Mary
 Viktor's wife, and supporting antagonist. Like the others in the mansion, Mary was subjected to her husband's strange curiosities, and has been transformed herself, and driven mad as a result. Seen only at a distance, she leads Josh through the mansion, and orchestrates several boss battles. However, she is not what she appears—and her plans are even more personal than Viktor's are.

 Sacha and Tasha
 A pair of somewhat snobby Russian ballerinas, and (arguably) identical twins. They both survive the train wreck, only to vanish, and reappear as the undead stars of a dual boss battle, mocked up as a ballet performance. They come across as arrogant and bratty, and are prone to arguing amongst themselves when something goes wrong, as seen when the player dodges their dual attack. They are the first real boss encounter, overseen by Mary.

 Jane
 Jane is a British psychiatrist. Mild-mannered and quiet, she is smart and uses it to her advantage, though she questions herself at times. She survives the train wreck, reappearing in the mansion, only to be captured and taken away by Ernst. She reappears to become an undead threat, insisting upon her state of life, even as her mutilated body and inexplicable abilities argue to the contrary. Unlike the others, her alterations are mostly mental, and she is unaware of what has happened to her, continuing to question it throughout the battle. Her quiet demeanor conceals a repressed, carnal nature.

 Monica
 A blonde, naive American girl, headed to a rave with her friends, Max, Katja and Aaron. An intoxicated Josh turns his attention to her while arguing with Kate, causing her to leave and triggering the events of the game. She survives the train wreck, only to be decapitated shortly afterward. She is the first meaningful survivor casualty, and later returns as a puppet-themed boss alongside Max. She alternates between mockery and apology throughout the battle, insisting that the two are being controlled. She and Max were involved, and she (mistakenly) believed he cared about her.

 Max
 A young German punk with a shaved head, headed to the rave with the others. Foul-mouthed and hot-tempered, Max is the first to shout and curse when things start going wrong, and plunges himself heedlessly into danger. He is captured with Josh, tortured, and murdered, only to reappear as a half-mechanized undead with Monica later in the game. Despite his personality, he shows some wit in the battle, using misdirection tricks to better get the drop on the player. Unlike Monica, he shows little remorse in being pitted against Josh. He has no real feelings for Monica, and planned to use her to smuggle contraband into the U.S.

 Aaron
 A German man with stringy brown hair, headed to the rave with the others. He is the first character the player controls, in the 'Chapter 0' tutorial before the beginning of the game. He unwillingly fights his way through the dungeon in attempts to find a way out for himself and Katja, only to walk into a crushing trap when they finally reach the apparent end. Not much is seen of his personality. Like the others, he survived the train wreck, and reappeared with Sacha and Tasha outside the mansion, before everyone is captured.

 Katja
 A dark-haired French girl, headed to the rave with her friends. She survived the train wreck, only to be captured and locked in the dungeons with Aaron. She is the first other character the player comes across, and urges Aaron to find them both a way out. She suspects the trap before they trigger it, but notices the masked monster gesturing to them from outside the recently-dropped gate. She panics, failing to realize the significance of that, and runs right into it anyway, taking Aaron with her. She was well-aware of Max's true nature, but never mentioned it.

 Fido/Marchosias
 The head of a somewhat obese British man, attached to the body of a small dog. 'Fido' (as Josh calls him) was a servant of Viktor, until his master decided to take his head off his body and remove his heart, locking him in a shed. Fido promises to help the player in return for freedom and his stolen heart, which he needs to animate his real body. He has a polite, if not somewhat effeminate, manner about him. He reappears later and plays a rather surprising role.

 Lin
 A young Asian girl who ran away from home and traveled to Europe to find herself. Lin is a survivor from the crash, is seen on the train before the crash, and as the chaos begins. When Josh comes across the first undead creature, Lin witnesses him kill it, and then she runs away and is never seen or heard from in the game again. Most people assume she was either killed, or she escaped right before the chaos started. It is not explained.

Plot

The game begins when a couple of prisoners attempting to escape from the dungeon they are imprisoned in. After breaking out of their cell, they found a door but it was locked, one of the prisoners pulled a nearby lever which unlocked the door, however it also let loose the other creatures that were locked in the dungeon. They made it hall and saw a door, however, a monstrous masked figure suddenly appears, they panicked and ran towards the door. The door was locked and it also turned out to be a trap, the wall closes in and kills them both.
 
While on vacation in Romania, Josh, the main character, and his wife Kate are on a train with several other tourists. During the train ride, Kate is about to tell Josh something when she discovers he was hiding a bottle of alcohol, hinting at a drinking problem. Angry, she walks out and heads to the dining car. Josh comes across a Romanian man who tells him that his wife left a letter for him, and then Josh reads it. It says that Kate is sorry for getting angry at Josh and that she wasn't herself lately and also says for Josh to meet her at the dining cart. Feeling guilty, Josh heads to the dining car to apologize. On his way, he encounters many travelers, such as a Grandfather - Gregor, a student - Lin, two ballerinas called Sacha and Tasha; four teenagers - Monica, Max, Aaron and Katja - heading to a rave; an English psychiatrist called Jane; two Romanian generals; a Romanian ticket collector; a German businessman; and Yeli, a fortune-teller who gives Josh a grim prediction. He then proceeds further only to find the car covered in blood. Bursting into the car, he find his wife being carried out by a large man with an odd-looking mechanism on his face. One of the generals tries to stop the man but is ripped in half. Josh and Yeli follow, catching a glimpse of a strange man who is laughing maniacally. Suddenly, the train derails. Josh awakens to find the train in a river, and tries to save the ticket collector but fails. The general calls him to shore, and Josh runs to a cave where the other survivors are hiding.

The businessman walks away from the cave into the forest and is killed by something off-screen. Panicking, the survivors run deeper into the cave until they fall out the other side into a swamp. While making their way out the other general is pulled under and killed, causing the remaining survivors to panic. After escaping the swamp and walking through the forest, they come upon a cemetery where they meet up with another group of survivors, Aaron, Sacha and Tasha. The student wanders into a cellar and is heard screaming. Josh runs to help and finds her panicking, saying she saw a corpse move. Josh investigates and the corpse, along with several others reanimate and attack. The girl runs away and Josh fends them off before pursuing her. Josh exits the cellar and finds that all the survivors have run off due to the zombies. As Josh makes his way through the cemetery, he hears a scream and watches as Monica is decapitated by Ernst (the man who abducted his wife) and then thrown at a wall. Ernst then subdues Josh, who loses consciousness.

Josh awakens to find that he has been tied to a chair by Viktor, the mad scientist responsible for the zombies. Max is tied up as well, but is soon killed by Viktor. He is about to kill Josh when he gets a phone call and exits urgently, leaving a zombie nurse to finish the job. Fortunately, Josh is rescued and freed by the Romanian who told Josh of Kate's letter, and they attempt to find their way out. The two make their way through a hall when the survivor inspects a fresh bloodstain, only to end up bisected by a trap. Josh fights his way through a horde of zombies and encounters Jane, but she is kidnapped by Ernst. He later comes across a ringing phone. Josh answers and hears Kate begging him to help, followed by a woman's voice telling him that he will never find her, and a projector shows footage of a webcam with a mysterious woman next to Kate, who is captive in a torture chair. He continues to find strange bedrooms; in one such room, there is a crib and a doll making sounds of crying. He then finds a sewing room, filled with dresses and mannequins, one of which resembles like a zombie. He advances to a cave to find that the two Russian ballerinas are now zombies. The strange woman from before traps him in with the zombie twins. After he defeats them, he wanders outside to a courtyard.

In the courtyard, he hears someone asking him to help him out of the shed. The man (Fido) is suspiciously calm and claims to have been Viktor's employee once, also claiming to know how to release Kate. He has Josh search for the key and when freed, Josh is surprised to find that his head has been sewn to the body of a small lapdog. Fido tells Josh that he will only help him if Josh helps return him to his human state. After being restored, he  gives Josh the key to the tall tower and tells him there's a surprise at the top. Josh then wanders to the top of the tower to find the raver couple, now resembling marionettes. He kills them, and then is transported to a cave, where he picks up a mystical weapon, Azoth, that attaches to his left hand.

Josh eventually finds Kate, but she is strapped to a table with Viktor and Ernst next to her. Viktor tells Ernst to kill Josh, but Josh defeats him. Near death, Ernst becomes more human, and lets Josh and Kate escape. In a fit of rage, Viktor brutally murders Ernst. Josh and Kate run into a forest, but Kate is entranced by a sudden music that starts playing, and she wanders into a sacrificial site. Viktor is there, but in the body of a woman. He opens up a portal, but Josh destroys the towers that created it, and Viktor is burned to death. However, before he can reach Kate, Marchosias, or Fido in his human form, knocks Josh unconscious.

Josh wakes up to find that he is strapped to a vertical table, with the bodies of Viktor and Ernst present too. Marchosias reveals that he was fascinated by Viktor, and will use Josh in order to reincarnate him. Out of Viktor's corpse he pulls out an eel-like creature, and inserts it into Josh's mouth, making Viktor take the body of Josh.

Josh then reawakens to find himself in a prison cell, in the body of Ernst. He sees Kate walking along with Viktor, who is now in the body of Josh. Kate now believes that Viktor is Josh, and that Josh is Ernst. The two leave Josh/Ernst in his cell. Soon, Josh hears Aaron and Katja, who have escaped from their cell, an event that happens at the start of the game. They open all the cell doors, and Josh tries to follow them, but they scream and run away because they think that he is Ernst. Aaron and Katja run into a trap, and are crushed by two walls. Josh escapes, and also has the advantage of Ernst's two chain hands that can kill an enemy from a distance.

Josh runs after Kate, and sees her walking off with Viktor in Josh's body. He follows, and meets Marchosias. He then reveals an altered Jane, and tells her to kill Josh. Josh overpowers her, and she goes into a mental breakdown. As she starts to burn up, she jumps onto Marchosias, and they both burn together. Josh staggers out into the forest, and collapses.

He wakes up to see Yeli dancing in front of him, saying that before Josh can kill Viktor and claim back his body, he must enter the dream realm to learn why everything happened, then she stabs him with a dagger that sends him back to the train, but in his imagination. Josh can also hear what the other passengers were thinking at the time, before all of them turn into a blood-like gas.

He encounters the man who told him of his wife's letter, and he thinks briefly about how he hates travelling through the cursed forest. Josh then sees the student, who is thinking about how her parents will hate her once they find out that she dropped out of school. When Josh sees the two ballerinas, they both are thinking that without the other, they could be stars. Then he sees the four going to the rave. Aaron first thinks about how he doesn't like 'love and peace', Monica is thinking about how she loves Europe and how lovely Max is, Max is thinking about how to use Monica to smuggle drugs into America, and Katja is lamenting about how Monica is being used as Max's puppet. Josh then meets Jane, who is thinking about her next project, and how half-dead people can be used. She then snaps out of her dream, thinking that she might need counselling. Next, Josh sees the two Romanian generals. One is thinking about how he lost his friends in war because his gun jammed, the other is thinking about marrying the woman he loves and setting up his own business. The next man he sees is the ticket collector, who is strangely thinking about the train derailing. Unable to see Yeli, Josh then sees the German businessman, who wants to embezzle his company's funds. Lastly, he sees Kate. She is thinking about the fact that she is pregnant, a fact Josh didn't know. Viktor then appears by her side, saying that she is the same as his wife Mary. Kate then turns into gas, Viktor sees Josh, and he runs away.

Next, Josh is led to Viktor's memories with Mary. At first, Mary and Viktor were happy because they could have a baby. Then, Josh learns that Viktor tried to make the baby genetically perfect but accidentally killed it, and Mary shouted at him. He strangled Mary to death mindlessly, and then he vowed to learn how to resurrect the dead to bring Mary back. He then sees Viktor dressed in Mary's clothes, and then Josh goes into Viktor's dream world to defeat him. Viktor scolds Josh, saying that his baby is gone, before Viktor suddenly turns into a complete robotic being. Josh finds Yeli's dagger, and stabs Viktor in the heart.

Josh wakes up to see that in real life, he has stabbed Yeli. Not only that, but he is in his own body, and not Ernst's. Josh coughs up Viktor's eel, and it dies. Yeli then tells Josh that Kate is at the ritual site, and she charges his Azoth. She then dies next to the body of Ernst. Josh proceeds to find Kate, and he is teleported to a staircase where he can hear Viktor and Mary. They are arguing, with Mary saying that Viktor killed their baby. Josh then arrives in Mary's dream world, a mystical land of floating islands. Josh finds Mary tending to his unborn baby. Mary demands that he leaves but Josh refuses and she battles him. She is actually a massive demon that flies, with another head in her heart-like body. Josh eventually kills her with the Azoth. Josh then takes back his baby, and the dream stops.

In a post-credits scene, Josh and a pregnant Kate are leaving Romania on a train. As Josh leaves, he bumps into a man, his face and body badly burned and bandaged. The man sits down near Kate, and opens his suitcase to reveal three small phials with the parasites in them. The man then laughs, and the game ends.

Development
A teaser trailer was shown at the 2010 Tokyo Game Show upon the game's announcement. The game was also in attendance for E3 2011.

Reception

Rise of Nightmares received "mixed" reviews according to the review aggregation website Metacritic. GameSpot praised the visual atmosphere and variety of weapons, but claimed that the motion controls of the game are unnatural and awkward. Joystiq praised the potential of the motion controls, but stated that the story of the game "is hackneyed at best and nonsensical at worst." In Japan, Famitsu gave it a score of one eight and three sevens for a total of 29 out of 40.

Sales
As of October 31, 2011, Rise of Nightmares sold 200,000 units worldwide.

In other media
Sega has formed the production company Stories International and is teaming up with Evan Cholfin for film and television projects based on their games with Rise of Nightmares as an animated project.

References

External links
 Rise of Nightmares American homepage
 Rise of Nightmares Japanese homepage
 

2011 video games
2010s horror video games
Kinect games
Sega video games
Single-player video games
Steampunk video games
Survival video games
Video games set in Romania
Xbox 360 games
Xbox 360-only games
Video games about zombies
Video games developed in Japan